HC Chrudim is an ice hockey team in Chrudim, Czech Republic. They played in the Czech 1.liga, the second level of ice hockey in the Czech Republic. The club was founded in 1931.

They folded in 2011 due to a lack of funding. A new club with the same name was then created, but it consists solely of junior and amateur teams.

Achievements
Promoted to Czech 2.liga : 2001
Promoted to Czech 1.liga : 2008

References

External links
 Official site

Ice hockey teams in the Czech Republic
Ice hockey clubs established in 1931
Chrudim District